Chukat, also rendered as Chaukat or Chokat or Chugat, in Iran may refer to:
 Chukat-e Abdol Karim Bazar
 Chukat-e Bala
 Chukat-e Pain
 Chukat-e Vasat